Nicolás Moreno may refer to:

 Nicolás Moreno (artist) (1923–2012), Mexican landscape painter
 Nicolás Moreno (footballer, born 1928), Argentine footballer
 Nicolás Moreno (footballer, born 1994), Argentine defender